Younger is an American comedy-drama television series that premiered on March 31, 2015, on TV Land. Based on the Pamela Redmond Satran novel of the same name, the series was created by Darren Star, and stars Sutton Foster in the lead role of Liza Miller, a 40-year-old recently divorced mother who, after finding it difficult to get a job at her age, attempts to pass herself off as a 26-year-old in order to get any job in her pre-mom career to support herself and her college age daughter.Hilary Duff, Debi Mazar, Miriam Shor, Nico Tortorella, Molly Bernard, Peter Hermann, and Charles Michael Davis also star in supporting roles. On April 21, 2015, Younger was renewed for a second season of 12 episodes, which premiered in January 2016. On January 6, 2016, Younger was renewed for a third season of 12 episodes, which aired on September 28, 2016. Younger was renewed for a sixth season on June 4, 2018. On July 24, 2019, TV Land renewed the series for a seventh and final season which premiered on April 15, 2021 on Paramount+ and Hulu with the first 4 episodes available immediately and the rest debuting on a weekly basis.

Series overview

Episodes

Season 1 (2015)

Season 2 (2016)

Season 3 (2016)

Season 4 (2017)

Season 5 (2018)

Season 6 (2019)

Season 7 (2021)

Ratings

Season 1

Season 2

Season 3

Season 4

Season 5

Season 6

Summary

References

External links

 
 

Lists of American comedy-drama television series episodes
Lists of American romance television series episodes